Jombang is a city, district and the regency seat of Jombang Regency, East Java, Indonesia. It covers and area 0f 36.40 km2 and it had a population of 137,233 at the 2010 Census and 139,831 at the 2020 Census.

Climate
Jombang has a tropical savanna climate (Aw) with moderate to little rainfall from May to October and heavy rainfall from November to April.

References

Regency seats of East Java